Fairview High School is a public high school located in Fairview Township, Pennsylvania, and it is part of the Fairview School District. The school serves as the only high school in Fairview Township, and has a yearly enrollment of approximately 550-600 students. The school's mascot is the tiger and their colors are red and black.

Academics

Athletics
Fairview sports teams compete in PIAA District 10. Both males and females compete in many sports.

Boys' Sports 
Baseball
Basketball
Cross Country
Football
Golf
Lacrosse
Soccer
Swimming and Diving
Tennis
Track and Field
Cheerleading

Girls' Sports
Basketball
Cheerleading
Cross Country
Golf
Lacrosse
Soccer
Softball
Swimming and Diving
Tennis
Track and Field
Volleyball
Water Polo

Notable alumni
Ted Decker

References

External links
 
 Fairview School District
Fairview High School Information Fairview School District. Retrieved on 2012-07-29.

Public high schools in Pennsylvania
Educational institutions established in 1810
Schools in Erie County, Pennsylvania
1810 establishments in Pennsylvania